Sir  is a fictional character and the primary protagonist from Capcom's Ghosts 'n Goblins video game series. He first appeared in the 1985 video game Ghosts 'n Goblins, and has been well received since then. The character is also featured in several other Capcom video games outside the Ghosts 'n Goblins series.

He is named for King Arthur of Britain's legendary history. As such, the iOS games Ghosts 'n Goblins: Gold Knights and Ghosts 'n Goblins: Gold Knights II allow the player to choose between controlling him and another knight named Lancelot, or between him and yet another knight named Percival.

Appearances
In the Ghosts 'n Goblins series, Arthur is introduced as a knight clad in plate armor, who sets out on a quest to rescue Princess Prin Prin (Princess Guinevere in the English version) from Astaroth (also called the Devil or Great Satan), king of Demon World, battling supernatural monsters along the way using various Medieval weapons, including his iconic throwable lance. A running gag throughout the series has him lose his armor as he takes hits from enemies, forcing him to continue on wearing only boxer shorts until he finds replacement armor, loses a life, or finishes a level.

Outside of his own series, Arthur is a playable character in the shooter Cannon Spike, the tactical role-playing games Namco × Capcom and Project X Zone, and in the fighting game Marvel vs. Capcom 3: Fate of Two Worlds, as well as on its updated version, Ultimate Marvel vs. Capcom 3, and its sequel, Marvel vs. Capcom: Infinite. He also appears as an assist character in the fighting game Marvel vs. Capcom: Clash of Super Heroes, and makes a cameo appearance in the fighting game Tatsunoko vs. Capcom: Ultimate All Stars. In addition, his costume can be worn in the sports game We Love Golf! and the action-adventure game Dead Rising 2. Players will be able to dress as Arthur and use his weapons in Monster Hunter Generations. He appears as a Mii Costume in Super Smash Bros. Ultimate, which was introduced alongside costumes of Monster Hunter series characters.

Other media
Arthur appeared in the game-based manga series Hisshō Tekunikku Kan Peki-ban by Wan Pakku Comics. He also appears in Archie Comics' Worlds Unite crossover between its Mega Man and Sonic the Hedgehog titles, where he is one of many Capcom and Sega heroes recruited by Zero and Bunnie Rabbot to battle Sigma.

Reception

The character was well received by gaming media. Retro Gamer included him in the section "top ten forces of good" in their 2004 list of top 50 retro game heroes. GameDaily included Arthur in their "Top 25 Gaming Hunks", placing him 21st, and ranked him as the third best Capcom character of all time. IGN staff listed Arthur in their 2009 list of the characters they wished to see appear in a future Marvel vs. Capcom title, calling him "a true gaming icon that nonetheless hasn't seen much love [i]n recent years."  In 2012, GamesRadar ranked him as the 64th "most memorable, influential, and badass" protagonist in games, for his "audacity to charge heedlessly into the creepiest graveyard known to man wearing nothing but his boxer shorts." In 2013, GamesRadar staff included him among the 30 best characters in the three decades of Capcom's history.

UGO Networks listed him showing skivvies as the 22nd best fan service in Marvel vs. Capcom 3. He was also featured in a 2010s list of "gaming's most inappropriate outfits ever" by NowGamer, who commented that his armor "looks fine, but as a defensive measure it couldn't be more shoddy." In addition, Nintendo Power included the phrase "Take a key for coming in" among their collection of classic quotes in video games' history.

References

Capcom protagonists
Ghosts 'n Goblins
Fictional blade and dart throwers
Fictional knights in video games
Male characters in video games
Fictional swordfighters in video games
Orphan characters in video games
Fictional polearm and spearfighters
Video game characters introduced in 1985
Video game mascots